Chehel Sar is a village in Mahvelat-e Shomali Rural District, Shadmehr District, Mahvelat County, Razavi Khorasan Province, Iran. At the 2006 census, its population was 172, in 47 families.

References 

Populated places in Mahvelat County